Kulia is a union parishad situated at the north-west part of Debhata Upazila,  in Satkhira District, Khulna Division of Bangladesh.

History 
Guruthakurgans of Satkhira zamindars lived in Kulia Union which is why the post office and a village are called Gurugram.

Geography 
Kuliya Union is bounded on the north by Alipore Union, on the south by Parulia Union, on the east by Fingri Union and Bhomra, which is adjacent to the Indian state of West Bengal.

Area: 59.49 sq. km.

Demographics 
Population: 35,154. 17,949 males, 18,205 females, 26,364 Muslims, 6,375 Hindus and 2,393 others.

Administration

List of chairmen 
Current Chairman is Md. Asadul Haque

Education
Just like any other areas in Bangladesh, Kulia has few number of educational institutions. They include:

 Bohera A.T. Secondary School
 Kulia Girls Secondary School
 Bohera Primary School
 Hazrat Naimuddin (RH) Hafijia & Foorkania Madrasah
 Shashadanga Government Primary School

Literacy rate: 86.04%

Educational Institutions

The number of primary schools is 8

02 secondary schools

1 secondary girls school

Dakhil Madrasa 3

There are 37 sub-formal schools

Jami Masjid 48

References 
http://www.bpcdoa.com/

http://kuliaup.satkhira.gov.bd/

Unions of Debhata Upazila
Unions of Satkhira District